Pucarajo (possibly from Quechua puka red, rahu snow, ice, mountain with snow, "red snow-covered mountain") is a mountain in the southern part of the Cordillera Blanca in the Andes of Peru, about  high. It is situated in the Ancash Region, Recuay Province, Catac District. The peaks of Pucarajo lies southeast, south and southwest of Mururaju.

Sources 

Mountains of Peru
Mountains of Ancash Region